Sergio Gama Dufour (born 27 June 1966) is a Mexican politician from the National Action Party. From 2009 to 2012 he served as Deputy of the LXI Legislature of the Mexican Congress representing San Luis Potosí.

References

1966 births
Living people
People from Rioverde, San Luis Potosí
National Action Party (Mexico) politicians
21st-century Mexican politicians
Deputies of the LXI Legislature of Mexico
Members of the Chamber of Deputies (Mexico) for San Luis Potosí